The President of Borgorosso Football Club (Italian: Il presidente del Borgorosso Football Club) is a 1970 Italian sports comedy film directed by Luigi Filippo D'Amico and starring Alberto Sordi, Tina Lattanzi and Margarita Lozano.

The film was mostly shot in the Province of Ravenna, using football stadiums in Bagnacavallo and Lugo as well as the home of Molinella Calcio 1911. The film's sets were designed by the art director Umberto Turco.

Synopsis
After inheriting a small-town football club in Romagna from his long-estranged father, Vatican official Benito Fornaciari shows little interest despite the club being promoted shortly afterwards. However, after selling several top players provokes a riot in the town, he has a damascene conversion and begins to plough huge amounts of money in the club and hires a supposedly brilliant Peruvian coach. When he proves to be inept and the club loses several games at the start of the new season, Fornaciari himself takes over control of the team from the bench. This leads to a dramatic surge in form as the club win match after match, with Fornaciari rallying the fans in a populist manner. He takes this too far during a local derby, provoking a pitch invasion and major damage to a rival team's stadium.

The ensuing trouble, including a fine and a points deduction, leads a rival consortium to try and oust Fornaciari as President. However, he counters by signing Omar Sívori for Borgorosso and is acclaimed by the supporters once more. The film ends with Fornaciari leading a convoy of the team and their supporters to an away game, in exactly the same style his father had done at the beginning.

The film is known to the Italian public for the sheer amount of stereotypes that depict the Italian society of the 1970s. Examples of this include the fraud Italian-Peruvian manager, who puts on a fake South American accent to fool the president, and the overwhelming presence of the Catholic Church, represented by the priest who rushes the weekly mass to make sure he can attend the match.

Cast

References

Bibliography 
 Claudio G. Fava. Alberto Sordi. Gremese Editore, 2003.

External links 
 

1970 films
Italian sports comedy films
1970s sports comedy films
Italian association football films
1970s Italian-language films
Films directed by Luigi Filippo D'Amico
Films set in Rome
1970s Italian films